Figeac is a railway station in Figeac, Occitanie, France. The station is a keilbahnhof, situated at the junction of the Brive–Toulouse (via Capdenac) railway and Figeac–Arvant railway lines. The station is served by Intercités de nuit (night train) and TER (local) services operated by SNCF.

The station was mostly destroyed by a fire of mysterious origin overnight the 21-22 of November 2018. Despite the efforts of around fifty firefighters from Figeac and surrounding areas, the station's smoke-stained walls were pretty much all that remained standing. An inquiry ruled the fire as "accidental," but questions remain.

Reconstruction of the station began in 2021, and it is expected to re-open to passengers in early 2023.  In the meantime, SNCF has moved its operations to a nearby parking lot where buses and trains now embark their passengers.

The station itself is located south of the river Célé, near the Hotel de Ville. It is easily accessed from the N122 and several departmental routes.

Train services
The following services currently call at Figeac:
night services (Intercités de nuit) Paris–Orléans–Figeac–Rodez–Albi
local service (TER Occitanie) Toulouse–Figeac–Aurillac
local service (TER Occitanie) Brive-la-Gaillarde–Figeac–Rodez

Bus services

Bus Services leave the station for Decazeville.

References

Railway stations in Lot (department)
Railway stations in France opened in 1862